Jeffrey Ryan Beliveau (born 17 January 1987) is an American professional baseball pitcher who is currently a free agent. He previously pitched in MLB for the Chicago Cubs, Tampa Bay Rays, Toronto Blue Jays, and Cleveland Indians.

As an amateur, Beliveau played college baseball at Florida Atlantic University and the College of Charleston. He has also competed for the United States national baseball team.

High school and college
Beliveau attended Bishop Hendricken High School in Warwick, Rhode Island. Originally an outfielder, Beliveau tried out for the team as a pitcher between his junior and senior seasons. As a senior in 2005, Beliveau had a 10-0 win–loss record with a 0.71 earned run average, which saw him named the Gatorade High School Player of the Year for Rhode Island.

Beliveau then enrolled at College of Charleston, where he played college baseball for the College of Charleston Cougars baseball team in the Southern Conference of the National Collegiate Athletic Association's (NCAA) Division I. In two years at College of Charleston, Beliveau had a 9–5 record, and the team reached the Super Regionals in 2006. Later that summer, he played for the Newport Gulls of the New England Collegiate Baseball League, compiling a 2–0 record with a 1.25 earned run average and helping the Gulls to a league record 32–10 season. He transferred Florida Atlantic University for his junior season in 2008, where he played for the Florida Atlantic Owls baseball team in the Sun Belt Conference. Beliveau led all Owls pitchers with 78 strikeouts in  innings pitched.

Professional career

Chicago Cubs

The Chicago Cubs drafted Beliveau in the 18th round (551st overall) of the 2008 MLB draft. After signing with the Cubs, he appeared in one game for the Arizona League Cubs in the rookie-level Arizona League, before receiving a promotion to the Boise Hawks of the Class-A Short Season Northwest League. In 2008, he had a combined 2–1 record, a 2.80 earned run average, 52 strikeouts and 28 walks in  innings. Beliveau joined the Peoria Chiefs of the Class-A Midwest League in 2009, earning a promotion to the Daytona Cubs of the Class-A Advanced Florida State League in 2010. Beliveau pitched for Daytona and the Tennessee Smokies of the Double-A Southern League in 2011. The Cubs added Beliveau to the 40 man roster after the 2011 season to protect him from the Rule 5 draft.

Beliveau made his MLB debut with the Cubs on 22 July 2012. The Cubs designated him for assignment after the season.

Tampa Bay Rays
Beliveau was claimed by the Texas Rangers, who optioned him to the Round Rock Express of the Triple-A Pacific Coast League for the start of the 2013 season. After designating him for assignment, the Rangers traded him to the Tampa Bay Rays on 16 April.

On 27 August 2013, Beliveau was recalled by the Rays from the Triple-A Durham Bulls. He did not get into any games before being optioned to the Double-A Montgomery Biscuits on 29 August. He was recalled on 21 September after an 18-inning game against the Baltimore Orioles. In 2014, Beliveau made 30 relief appearances and posted a 2.63 earned run average and 28 strikeouts in 24 innings. In 2015, he made five appearances for Tampa and had a 13.50 earned run average.

Baltimore Orioles
Beliveau signed a minor league contract with the Baltimore Orioles in December 2015.

He spent the 2016 season with the Advanced-A Frederick Keys and the Double-A Bowie Baysox, where he had a combined 4–0 record, 2.54 earned run average, and 66 strikeouts in 49 innings.

Toronto Blue Jays
On 15 December 2016, Beliveau signed a minor league contract with the Toronto Blue Jays that included an invitation to spring training.

Beliveau started the 2017 season with the Triple-A Buffalo Bisons. He was called up by the Blue Jays on 5 June 2017, while the team was in Oakland. On 22 July, Beliveau was designated for assignment. He cleared waivers and was outrighted to the Buffalo Bisons on 25 July. On 13 October, Beliveau elected free agency.

Cleveland Indians
On 22 November 2017, Beliveau was signed by the Cleveland Indians to a minor league contract with an invitation to the club's 2018 spring training camp.

Beliveau's contract was purchased by the Indians on 26 April 2018. He was designated for assignment on 4 May 2018, outrighted to the Columbus Clippers on 7 May, and had his contract purchased again by the Indians on 29 May. Beliveau was later designated for assignment again on 2 June and outrighted once more to Columbus on 5 June. He was released by the organization on 8 August 2018.

International career
After the 2011 season, Beliveau played for the United States national baseball team in the 2011 Baseball World Cup and the 2011 Pan American Games, winning the silver medal.

References

External links

1987 births
Living people
American expatriate baseball players in Canada
Arizona League Cubs players
Baseball players at the 2011 Pan American Games
Baseball players from Providence, Rhode Island
Bishop Hendricken High School alumni
Boise Hawks players
Bowie Baysox players
Buffalo Bisons (minor league) players
Chicago Cubs players
Cleveland Indians players
College of Charleston Cougars baseball players
Columbus Clippers players
Daytona Cubs players
Durham Bulls players
Florida Atlantic Owls baseball players
Frederick Keys players
Iowa Cubs players
Major League Baseball pitchers
Mesa Solar Sox players
Montgomery Biscuits players
Pan American Games medalists in baseball
Pan American Games silver medalists for the United States
Peoria Chiefs players
Round Rock Express players
Tampa Bay Rays players
Tennessee Smokies players
Toronto Blue Jays players
United States national baseball team players
Medalists at the 2011 Pan American Games